Milton is an unincorporated community in Union Township, Ohio County, in the U.S. state of Indiana.

History
Pinkney James started a gristmill and sawmill at Milton in 1824. James laid out the community in 1825.

A post office was established at Milton in 1847, and remained in operation until it was discontinued in 1850.

Geography

References

Unincorporated communities in Ohio County, Indiana
Unincorporated communities in Indiana